Never the Twain is a British sitcom that ran for eleven series from 7 September 1981 to 9 October 1991.

It was created by Johnnie Mortimer, and was the only sitcom he ever created without his usual writing partner, Brian Cooke. Mortimer wrote the entirety of the first two series, one episode of the seventh, and five out of six episodes of the eighth, with the rest being mainly written by John Kane and Vince Powell (who wrote the whole of the last three series).

The series starred Windsor Davies (previously known for It Ain't Half Hot, Mum) and Donald Sinden as rival antique dealers, and also co-starred Robin Kermode (later replaced by Christopher Morris), Julia Watson (later replaced by Tacy Kneale), Honor Blackman, Teddy Turner, Derek Deadman, Maria Charles and Zara Nutley.

It was made by Thames Television for the ITV network. Since its run ended, it has been repeated a few times, including on UK Gold, later on ITV3, and more recently on Forces TV.

The title is taken from the Rudyard Kipling poem The Ballad of East and West. The show's theme tune was composed by Jack Trombey and the track was entitled Domino.

Plot

Oliver Smallbridge, played by Windsor Davies, and Simon Peel, played by Donald Sinden, are antiques dealers who are also bitter enemies (after a falling-out having been business partners) and next-door neighbours, both in their homes and shops. They are engaged in a continuous game of one-upmanship, so both of them are shocked when they find out that their respective children (Smallbridge's daughter Lyn – played by Watson and later Kneale – and Peel's son David – played by Kermode and later Morris) are in love and want to marry as soon as possible. The fathers are forced to reluctantly accept the relationship and marriage, which takes place at the end of the first series.

It is the impending marriage of Lyn and David and the early days of their marriage, alongside Oliver and Simon battling over the affection of middle-class widow Veronica Barton (played by Blackman), that provides the basis for the first two series (both written entirely by Mortimer). The third series features a failed attempt by Simon and Oliver to try to renew their business partnership.

After the third series, Lyn and David move to Vancouver in Canada, leaving the daily goings on at Simon and Oliver's shops and in their private lives as the main themes of the show. Other notable characters in the series are Simon's butler Banks (played by Turner), a replacement for a foreign au pair that Simon had requested; Ringo (played by Deadman), Oliver's idiotic assistant in his shop; and Mrs. Sadler (played by Charles), Oliver's clumsy cleaner, who has an annoying tendency to accidentally break things. Banks and Mrs. Sadler's amorous relationship provides humorous material in these series, with both of them marrying and leaving the show at the end of the seventh series. The fourth to seventh series were written by a group of writers, Powell and Me and My Girl co-creator Kane being the most prominent.

In the eighth series (mostly written again by Mortimer), Lyn and David return from Canada with their son (and Oliver's and Simon's grandson) Martin, who provides a new platform on which Simon and Oliver can develop their long-standing rivalry, fighting over who is the better grandfather. However, at the end of that series, Lyn, David and Martin move to a new flat in Friern Barnet.

Simon and Oliver's daily personal and business lives are the primary focus of the final three series (all written in their entirety by Powell). In these series, another character (who had already made two appearances in series 4 and 7) begins to appear regularly: Simon's Aunt Eleanor (played by Nutley, who had also appeared in Vince Powell's earlier sitcom Mind Your Language), moves near Oliver and Simon.

Also, appearing in some episodes of the series were Donald Sinden's sons Marc and Jeremy, while his wife Diana appeared in the last ever episode.

Episodes

Home releases
The complete first series was released on DVD in June 2001 by Clear Vision and no other series were released. It was announced that a different company would release a DVD featuring the first two series, it was released in September 2010.

An 11-disc complete series set, through Network, was released on 21 October 2019.

In Australia (Region 4), Via Vision Entertainment release The Complete Series in a 11-Disc box set on January 6, 2021.

Locations
The outside filming location for the two antique shops in the early series was a double-fronted restaurant on The Green in the village of Claygate in Surrey, just six miles to the south of Thames Television’s Teddington Studios. They then used some shops at 10-12 Queen's Road, Hersham, Surrey. The churches used for the weddings were St Andrew's Church, Ham, Surrey and St Andrew's Church, Cobham, Surrey. The houses used in the early series were on Burtenshaw Road, Thames Ditton, Surrey. One of these has since been demolished and another house built on the plot. Later houses on Brook Farm Road and Oak Road, Cobham were used.

Repeats
Beginning in early 2006, ITV3 began showing repeats beginning with series one in a late afternoon timeslot with other classic ITV comedy series such as Rising Damp and On the Buses. From late January 2019, coincidentally a short time after the announcement of Windsor Davies's death, Forces TV started broadcasting the show as double bills from the very start.

Interviews
The Bill Podcast: Jon Iles (2017)

References

External links

1980s British sitcoms
1990s British sitcoms
1981 British television series debuts
1991 British television series endings
English-language television shows
ITV sitcoms
Television series by Fremantle (company)
Television shows produced by Thames Television
Television shows set in Surrey
Fictional rivalries
Television shows shot at Teddington Studios